A list of films produced in Argentina in 2004:

2004

See also
2004 in Argentina

External links and references
 Argentine films of 2004 at the Internet Movie Database

2004
Films
Argentine